Sodium cyclopentadienide is an organosodium compound with the formula C5H5Na. The compound is often abbreviated as NaCp, where Cp− is the cyclopentadienide anion. Sodium cyclopentadienide is a colorless solid, although samples often are pink owing to traces of oxidized impurities.

Preparation
Sodium cyclopentadienide is commercially available as a solution in THF. It is prepared by treating cyclopentadiene with sodium:

The conversion can be conducted by heating a suspension of molten sodium in dicyclopentadiene.  In former times, the sodium was provided in the form of "sodium wire" or "sodium sand", a fine dispersion of sodium prepared by melting sodium in refluxing xylene and rapidly stirring. Sodium hydride is a convenient base:

In early work, Grignard reagents were used as bases. With a pKa of 15, cyclopentadiene can be deprotonated by many reagents.

Applications
Sodium cyclopentadienide is a common reagent for the preparation of metallocenes. For example, the preparation of ferrocene and zirconacene dichloride: and zirconocene dichloride:

Sodium cyclopentadienide is also used for the preparation of substituted cyclopentadienyl derivatives such as the ester and formyl derivatives:

These compounds are used to prepare substituted metallocenes such as 1,1'-ferrocenedicarboxylic acid.

Structure
The nature of NaCp depends strongly on its medium and for the purposes of planning syntheses, the reagent is often represented as a salt . Crystalline solvent-free NaCp, which is rarely encountered, is a "polydecker" sandwich complex, consisting of an infinite chain of alternating Na+ centers sandwiched between μ-η5:η5-C5H5 ligands.  As a solution in donor solvents, NaCp is highly solvated, especially at the alkali metal as suggested by the isolability of the adduct Na(tmeda)Cp.

In contrast to alkali metal cyclopentadienides, tetrabutylammonium cyclopentadienide (Bu4N+C5H5−) was found to be supported entirely by ionic bonding and its structure is representative of the structure of the cyclopentadienide anion (C5H5−, Cp−) in the solid state.  However, the anion deviates somewhat from a planar, regular pentagon, with C–C bond lengths ranging from 138.0 -140.1 pm and C–C–C bond angles ranging from 107.5-108.8°.

See also
Lithium cyclopentadienide

References

Organosodium compounds
Cyclopentadienyl complexes
Non-benzenoid aromatic carbocycles